2CR may refer to:

 Second Epistle to the Corinthians (aka, Second Corinthians / 2 Corinthians), abbreviated as 2Cr
 ABC Central West, ABC Local Radio station in Orange, New South Wales, callsign 2CR
 2CR China Radio Network, the Chinese-language narrowcaster
 Heart Dorset & New Forest, the ILR station in Bournemouth, England, once known as 2CR FM

See also
 CCR (disambiguation)
 CR2 (disambiguation)
 CR (disambiguation)
 CRCR (disambiguation)